Adrián Paz Velázquez (born 1964) is a paralympic athlete from Mexico competing mainly in category F53 throwing events.

Adrian competed in four Paralympics, firstly in 1996 where as well as competing in the shot and discus he won the F52 javelin. In 2000 he moved to the F53 category and won a second javelin title as well as competing in the shot. He returned at the 2004 Summer Paralympics where he was unable to win a third successive javelin as he was beaten by New Zealand's Peter Martin, both throwing world records in their respective classes.  He also threw javelin in the 2008 Summer Paralympics but was unable to win a fourth medal.

References

Living people
1964 births
Paralympic athletes of Mexico
Athletes (track and field) at the 1996 Summer Paralympics
Athletes (track and field) at the 2000 Summer Paralympics
Athletes (track and field) at the 2004 Summer Paralympics
Athletes (track and field) at the 2008 Summer Paralympics
Paralympic gold medalists for Mexico
Paralympic silver medalists for Mexico
Mexican male javelin throwers
Medalists at the 1996 Summer Paralympics
Medalists at the 2000 Summer Paralympics
Medalists at the 2004 Summer Paralympics
Paralympic medalists in athletics (track and field)
Medalists at the 2007 Parapan American Games
Wheelchair javelin throwers
Paralympic javelin throwers